Candalides consimilis, the consimilis blue, is a species of butterfly of the family Lycaenidae. It was described by Gustavus Athol Waterhouse in 1942. It is found in Australia.

The wingspan is about 30 mm. Adult females are brown, while males are mauve with brown margins.

The larvae feed on the flowers of Hedera helix, Polyscias elegans, Polyscias sambucifolia, Ceratopetalum gummiferum and Alectryon coriaceus. They are variable in colour, ranging from pink, orange or yellow to green.

Subspecies
Candalides consimilis consimilis (Australia: Townsville to eastern Victoria)
Candalides consimilis goodingi Tindale, 1965 (Australia: eastern Victoria)
Candalides consimilis toza (Kerr, 1967) (Australia: Cape York, Claudie River)

References

Candalidini
Butterflies described in 1942